Avon Lake High School (ALHS) is a public high school  located in Avon Lake, Ohio, west of Cleveland. It serves grades 9–12. It is part of the Avon Lake City School District.

Academics
ALHS achieved "excellent" ratings on the Ohio State Report Card every year from 2003 to 2012. Reflecting the new statewide scoring, ALHS has consistently earned "A" grades for achievement (performance index and indicators met) and graduation rate since 2013. As of 2016, ALHS is ranked 261st by Newsweek Magazine and as of 2018, 668th by U.S. News & World Report. Avon Lake High School was ranked 170th in the nation by Newsweek Magazine in 2015. In 2011, Avon Lake City Schools were also recognized by Workplace Dynamics and the Cleveland Plain Dealer as the 8th best among "Northeast Ohio Top Workplaces" in the large companies category (companies with 500 or more local employees).

Athletics
Avon Lake has been part of the Southwestern Conference (SWC) since 1964. As well as having involvement in the vex robotics vrc program since 2017.

State championships

 Football - 2003
 Girls cross country - 1986, 1988
 Girls basketball - 1994
 Rugby (club) - 2015, 2019, 2021

Notable alumni
 Tom Batiuk, comic strip creator, best known for his long-running newspaper strip Funky Winkerbean.
Larry Cox, former executive director of Amnesty International
 Carmella DeCesare, Playboy Playmate
 Anne E. DeChant, singer/songwriter/guitarist.
 Angela Funovits, mentalist/illusionist and runner-up on NBC's Phenomenon.
 Jeremy Griffiths, Major League Baseball pitcher.
Matt Lundy, former member of the Ohio House of Representatives.
 Brian Mihalik, National Football League offensive tackle.
 Andy Schillinger, National Football League wide receiver.
 Dick Tomanek, Major League Baseball pitcher.
 Stephen Tompkins, artist, animator, and composer.
 Daryl Urig, illustrator and painter.

References

High schools in Lorain County, Ohio
Public high schools in Ohio
1923 establishments in Ohio
Educational institutions established in 1923